This is a list of the Croatia national football team results from 2000 to 2009.

After missing out UEFA Euro 2000, the team qualified for the next four major tournaments, the FIFA World Cups in 2002 and 2006 and the UEFA European Championships in 2004 and 2008, reaching the quarter-finals of Euro 2008. It then failed to qualify for the 2010 World Cup.

Key 

Match outcomes

As per statistical convention in football, matches decided in extra time are counted as wins and losses, while matches decided by penalty shoot-outs are counted as draws.

By year

2000

2001

2002

2003

2004

2005

2006

2007

2008

2009

Record per opponent

References

External links 

 Croatia  at FIFA.com
 Croatian Football Statistics

2000s in Croatia
2000-09